Viktor Petrovich Makeyev (also Makeev; ; 25 October 1924 – 25 October 1985) was a Soviet engineer in the Soviet space program who was also a central and founding figure in development of Submarine-launched ballistic missile (SLBM) for the Soviet Navy.

Work 
Makeyev's work has resulted in three generations of submarine-launched ballistic missiles being used by the Russian Navy.

Among these were:
First generation
 R-11FM – the first Soviet SLBM.
 R-13
 R-17 – known by NATO as Scud-B
 R-21 (SS-N-5 "Sark") – the first Soviet rocket with underwater launch (1963)
Second generation
 R-27 – the first rocket with factory fuelling (1968)
 R-27K
 R-29 – the world first intercontinental SLBM (1974)
Third generation
 R-29R – the first intercontinental SLBM with MRV (1977)
 R-39 – the first intercontinental SLBM with MIRV (1983)
 R-29RM – a complex rocket of very high technical perfection

The domestic school of sea rocket production, founded and headed by Makeyev, has reached world excellence in a number of tactical and operational characteristics of rockets, control systems, starting systems. The key areas of expertise are:
 accommodation of engines inside tanks of fuel or oxidizer
 maximizing fuel capacitance of rocket shell
 successful use of astrocorrection in ballistic missiles
 use of zone amortization using elastomer materials
 ampulized fuel tanks factory refuelling

Under his management the unique laboratory/experimental base provided complex ground working for rockets.

In 1991, the State Rocket Center Makeyev Rocket Design Bureau was named after him. Also named in honour of Makeyev are an avenue in Miass, a street in Kolomna, and a vessel of the Northern fleet. Makeyev's bust is displayed in Miass and Kolomna.

Grants in his name were established in several universities. The Federation of Astronautics of the country has founded a medal. The academician of the century of Item of V. Makeyev. Makeyev was the author of 32 basic inventions, and published more than 200 printed works including monographs.

Awards 
 1959 – Order of Lenin
 1961 – Hero of Socialist Labor (highest civilian award)
 1965 – Dr.Sci.Tech.
 1968 – Member of the USSR Academy of Sciences
 1968 – USSR State Prize
 1974 – Hero of Socialist Labor
 1978 – USSR State Prize
 1983 – USSR State Prize

Literature 
 "Rockets and people" – B. E. Chertok, M: "mechanical engineering", 1999.  
 "Testing of rocket and space technology - the business of my life" Events and facts - A.I. Ostashev, Korolyov, 2001.;
 "S. P. Korolev. Encyclopedia of life and creativity" - edited by C. A. Lopota, RSC Energia. S. P. Korolev, 2014 
 A.I. Ostashev, Sergey Pavlovich Korolyov - The Genius of the 20th Century — 2010 M. of Public Educational Institution of Higher Professional Training MGUL .
 "I look back and have no regrets. " - Author: Abramov, Anatoly Petrovich: publisher "New format" Barnaul, 2022.

External links 
 Viktor Makeyev family history

In English 
 SLBMs at RussianSpaceWeb.com
 Makeyev's State Rocket Centre
 Р-11ФМ
 P-21

In Russian 
 Airfleet
 Arms.ru БРПЛ Р-11ФМ 
 Arms.ru БРПЛ Р-27
 Makeyev (list of missiles)
 P-29
 P-29P
 P-29PM

1924 births
1985 deaths
Heroes of Socialist Labour
Moscow Aviation Institute alumni
Soviet space program personnel
Soviet scientists
Soviet inventors
Academic staff of the Moscow Institute of Physics and Technology
Full Members of the USSR Academy of Sciences